Events from the year 1880 in Sweden

Incumbents
 Monarch – Oscar II
 Prime Minister – Louis Gerhard De Geer, Arvid Posse

Events

 - The foundation of Norra Latin
 - The Seventh-day Adventist Church in Sweden is established. 
 - Creation of the Svenska Historiska Föreningen

Births

 22 February – Eric Lemming, athlete (died 1930).
 27 February – Olivia Nordgren, politician (died 1969)
 12 March – Henric Horn af Åminne, horse rider (died 1947).
 5 April 
 Eric Carlberg, modern pentathlete, fencer and sport shooter (died 1963). 
 Vilhelm Carlberg, sport shooter (died 1970). 
 17 May – Gustav Hedenvind-Eriksson, writer (died 1967). 
 30 June – Elisabeth Tamm, politician. (d. 1958)
 24 July –Kristian Hellström, athlete. (d. 1946)
 4 November – John Jarlén, gymnast (died 1955).

Deaths

 22 July - Betty Ehrenborg, writer  (born 1818) 
 10 March - Thekla Knös, writer  (born 1815)
 14 February - Christina Enbom, opera singer  (born 1804)

References

External links

 
Years of the 19th century in Sweden